Arturo Jaramillo is the Head of Regulation and Licensing Department in New Mexico. He also served as president of the New Mexico State Bar Association.

References

Santa Clara University alumni
Living people
Year of birth missing (living people)
New Mexico lawyers